Old Man River is the stage name of Australian-Israeli singer-songwriter Ohad Rein (born 18 April 1979), which is also the name of his band. At the APRA Awards of 2009, "Sunshine", co-written by Old Man River, won the Blues & Roots Work of the Year category.

Biography 

Ohad Rein was born on 18 April 1979 and grew up in Sydney (Australia). His parents are Israeli immigrants. He moved to Europe with his family at a very early age before moving to Israel where he served in the local army during his formative years. He spent many years abroad before returning to Sydney. He collaborated with Sydney band, Gelbison, touring with the band and co-writing some of the tracks which appear on his debut album Good Morning. This led to the side project Nations by the River, which combined Gelbison with Luke Steele from Sleepy Jackson.

The single "Sunshine" was used as a theme for Channel 7's Sunrise. The single "La" reached #83 on the German singles chart, topped the Japanese Radio Airplay chart and was #6 on Italy's airplay chart. "La", "Trousers" and "Sunshine" all received significant airplay on Triple J.

The single "La" was featured in a New York Lottery commercial.

In 2014 Ohad Rein was one of the contestants on the third season of The Voice Israel.

Members
 Ohad Rein (Vocals, Guitar)
 Liam Flanagan (Bass Guitar)
 Danny Heifetz (Drums)
 Rosie Henshaw (Backing Vocals, Sitar)

Discography

Albums

Extended plays

Charting singles

Awards and nominations

APRA Awards
The APRA Awards are presented annually from 1982 by the Australasian Performing Right Association (APRA), "honouring composers and songwriters". They commenced in 1982.

! 
|-
| 2008 
| "La" 
| Blues & Roots Work of the Year
| 
| 
|-
| 2009 
| "Sunshine" 
| Blues & Roots Work of the Year
| 
| 
|-

References

External links
 Official site

1979 births
APRA Award winners
20th-century Israeli Jews
21st-century Israeli Jews
Jewish Israeli musicians
Jewish Australian musicians
21st-century Israeli male musicians
Australian people of Israeli descent
Living people
Musicians from Sydney
21st-century Australian male musicians